"I Want to Be Free" is a song by the English new wave band Toyah, fronted by Toyah Willcox, released as a single in May 1981 by Safari Records. The song promoted Toyah's 1981 studio album Anthem and was a Top 10 chart hit in the UK and Ireland.

Background
The song was written by Toyah Willcox and Joel Bogen, and produced by Nick Tauber. Willcox explained that it "resonated how I felt about school years which was still very strongly with me even when I was 22". It is about Toyah's frustration as a dyslexic teenager when she was, as she said, "being forced not to be myself, my natural self". The lyric originated when Toyah was fourteen and was developed into the final song in 1981. She further explained that the song is "about seeing the individual, it's about hearing and understanding the individual, not wiping them away from a future just because they can't add up or don't write particularly well. Also, it's about us having the choice".

The single was released in May 1981 only in the 7" vinyl format. There were two variations of the single artwork – with a black or a white border. The two non-album B-sides, "Walkie-Talkie" and "Alien", were eventually included on the 1999 CD reissue of Anthem as well as the 2005 compilation The Safari Singles Collection Part 2: 1981–1983.

Bolstered by the performance of the previous single, "It's a Mystery", and backed by an appearance on Top of the Pops, "I Want to Be Free" entered the UK Top 10 where it would peak at number 8, and helped push the album Anthem into the UK Albums Chart, where it peaked at number 2. It was also Toyah's second number 1 on the UK Independent Singles Chart and the band's most internationally successful single, reaching the Top 10 in Ireland and the Top 40 in Australia and New Zealand, among others. It was eventually certified silver in the UK.

Music video
The music video for the song was directed by Godley & Creme.

Track listing
 7" single
A. "I Want to Be Free" (Toyah Willcox, Joel Bogen) – 3:10
B1. "Walkie-Talkie" (Willcox, Bogen) – 2:03
B2. "Alien" (Willcox, Bogen, Nigel Glockler) – 3:15

Personnel
 Toyah Willcox – vocals
 Joel Bogen – guitar
 Phil Spalding – bass
 Nigel Glockler – drums
 Adrian Lee – keyboards

Charts

Certifications

References

External links
 Official audio stream at YouTube
 The official Toyah website

1981 singles
1981 songs
Toyah (band) songs
Songs written by Toyah Willcox
Songs written by Joel Bogen
Safari Records singles
UK Independent Singles Chart number-one singles